The Sub-Antarctic Islands Scientific Expedition of 1907 was organised by the Philosophical Institute of Canterbury. The main aim of the expedition was to extend the magnetic survey of New Zealand by investigating Campbell Island and the Auckland Islands, but botanical, biological and zoological surveys were also conducted.

Preparations 
The planning committee of the Philosophical Institute of Canterbury approached the various branches of the New Zealand Institute for support and armed with this, approached the New Zealand Minister in Charge of Marine Department, John A. Millar, for possible transport. On being informed that neither of the New Zealand Government steam ships would be available, the committee sent a delegation to the Acting Premier, William Hall-Jones.

By 8 June 1907, it was confirmed that  under the captaincy of John Bollons would be available to transport the expedition.

Personnel 
A group of 26 participants went on the expedition. The group was split into two main parties—one for Campbell Island and one for the Auckland Islands—with the intention that the groups were to be dropped off to survey while NZGSS Hinemoa conducted its regular round of checking the castaway depots at other subantarctic islands before returning to pick the groups up.

Botany survey
 Leonard Cockayne
 Bernard Aston
 John Smaillie Tennant
 Arthur Dorrien-Smith
 Robert M. Laing
 Joseph Crosby-Smith

Geology survey
 Robert Speight
 Alexander Moncrief Finlayson
 G. S. Collyns
 Patrick Marshall
 Robert Browne

Magnetic survey
 Coleridge Farr
 Henry Denman Cook
 Henry Fawsit Skey
 Edward Kidson
 C. A'Court Opie

Zoology survey
 William Benham
 George Hudson
 Edgar Ravenswood Waite
 Charles Chilton
 George Marriner
 James Boxer Mayne
 Harry Borrer Kirk

Expedition 

 departed from Bluff on 14 November 1907, and the expedition arrived at Port Pegasus on Stewart Island in the early afternoon. Some disembarked for an episode of botanical collecting. The voyage continued at 21:00 that evening with an overnight steam to the Snares Islands, which were reached at 06:00. All of 15 November was spent at The Snares exploring the islands and collecting soil, rock, zoological and botanical specimens.

After ensuring that the castaways were supplied with provisions and taking on board one of the castaways to act as a cook for the Campbell Island expedition group, the Auckland Islands expedition party was dropped off at Camp Cove.

Campbell Island was reached on 18 November, and the remainder of the expedition was dropped off. Hinemoa returned and picked up the Campbell Island group on 25 November. While Hinemoa was away, the Auckland Islands group, who had also been supplied with a whaleboat and crew, were rowed to various locations around Auckland Islands during their ten-day stay. With the return of the Hinemoa on 26 November, the Auckland Islands group packed up and boarded the vessel.

On 27 November, the ship steamed to Enderby Island for further exploration and specimen hunting, before moving on to Disappointment Island on 28 November. A number of expedition members collected specimens and samples while Captain Bollons organised the exhumation of the Dundonalds chief mate, Jabez Peters, for reburial at Hardwicke cemetery. The funeral was held that evening. Hinemoa arrived back in Bluff on 30 November.

References

Sources 
Bibliography

 
 

Newspapers

External links 
 

1907 in Antarctica
1907 in New Zealand
Auckland Islands
Campbell Island, New Zealand
Expeditions from New Zealand
History of the New Zealand outlying islands
New Zealand and the Antarctic
Subantarctic expeditions